Serine/threonine-protein phosphatase 2A 55 kDa regulatory subunit B alpha isoform is an enzyme regulator that in humans is encoded by the PPP2R2A gene.

Function 

The product of this gene belongs to the phosphatase 2 regulatory subunit B family. Protein phosphatase 2 is one of the four major Ser/Thr phosphatases, and it is implicated in the negative control of cell growth and division. It consists of a common heteromeric core enzyme, which is composed of a catalytic subunit and a constant regulatory subunit, that associates with a variety of regulatory subunits. The B regulatory subunit might modulate substrate selectivity and catalytic activity. This gene encodes an alpha isoform of the regulatory subunit B55 subfamily.

Interactions 

PPP2R2A has been shown to interact with:

 P70-S6 Kinase 1, 
 PPP2CA,
 PPP2R1A, 
 PPP2R1B, 
 TGF beta receptor 1,  and
 p107.

References

Further reading